Rompiendo El Hielo (Breaking the Ice) is the 2002 debut album by reggaeton duo Magnate y Valentino.

Track listing
 Intro
 Como Es Que Tú Te Vas
 Quiero Que Hagas Mujer (feat. Nicky Jam)
 Yal
 Gata Celosa (feat. Héctor y Tito)
 Ven Conmigo (Magnate solo)
 Dime Donde (Valentino solo)
 Bala Contra Bala
 Anda
 Tú Al Igual Que Yo
 Así Es la Vida (Magnate solo)
 Te Buscaré (Magnate solo)

Magnate & Valentino albums
2002 albums
Albums produced by Noriega